Saint-Jacques du Haut-Pas is a Roman Catholic parish church in Paris, France. The cathedral is located at the corner of Rue Saint-Jacques and Rue de l'Abbé de l'Épée in the 5th arrondissement of Paris. The church has been registered as a historical monument since 4 June 1957.

Origins 

The land on which the church is built was obtained around 1180 by the Order of Saint James of Altopascio.
In 1360 the order built a simple chapel.  
Despite the suppression of their order by Pope Pius II in 1459, some brothers decided to remain. At that time the land around them was fields and meadows with a few low peasant houses and some religious institutions.

In 1572 Catherine de' Medici decided to use the site as home for a group of Benedictine monks who had been expelled from their abbey of Saint-Magloire. The relics of St. Magloire of Dol and his disciples had been transported to Paris by Hugh Capet in 923, when the Normans attacked Brittany.  The relics were transferred to the hospital, which became a monastery. In 1620, the seminary of the Oratorians under Pierre de Bérulle, their first seminary in France, replaced the Benedictines. 
It was known as the seminary of Saint-Magloire. Jean de La Fontaine stayed there as a novice.

Initial construction 

The surrounding population increased and the faithful became accustomed to praying in the chapel of the Benedictines.
The monks found themselves inconvenienced and demanded the departure of the lay people. 
In 1582 the bishop then gave permission for construction of a church adjoining the monastery of Saint-Magloire. 
A small church was built in 1584, serving the parishes of Saint-Hippolyte, Saint-Benoît and Saint-Médard.
In this church the choir was oriented eastward, backing onto the rue Saint-Jacques. 
The church was entered through the monastery cemetery.  
A cemetery was opened in 1584 beside the original chapel, along today's rue de l’Abbé-de-l’Épée.  It was closed in 1790.
The original gallery organ was made by Vincent Coupeau, an organist of the parish, and was installed in 1628.

The church was quickly found to be too small.
In 1630 Gaston, Duke of Orléans, brother of Louis XIII, decided to undertake major construction. 
The back wall of the church was demolished and the direction reversed, so the entrance was now from the Rue Saint-Jacques. 
The work progressed very slowly due to lack of money, since the parish was poor. 
The Gothic vault that was originally planned could not be undertaken. 
However, master carriers offered to pave the choir at no cost, and workers of various trades worked on the church for one day a week without pay.

On 9 April 1633 Parliament created a parish around the church. 
There was already a church in Paris dedicated to Saint James the Elder of Santiago de Compostela, the church of Saint-Jacques-de-la-Boucherie.
Only the tower of this church remains today, the Tour Saint-Jacques. 
It was decided to dedicate the new church to Saint James the Minor and Philip the Apostle. 
These have always been the two patrons of the church of Saint-Jacques-du-Haut-Pas.

Later construction 

In 1625 Angélique Arnaud, abbess of Port-Royal, home of the Jansenist movement, decided  to install an annex of the abbey of Port-Royal-des-Champs in the rue du Faubourg-Saint-Jacques. Strong links were forged with the parish of Saint-Jacques-du-Haut-Pas, which played an important role in the spread of Jansenism. The church contains the tomb of Jean du Vergier de Hauranne (1581–1643), the abbot of Saint-Cyran, a theologian who was a friend of Cornelius Jansen and was responsible for the spread of Jansenism in France. His tomb quickly became a major pilgrimage destination.

The Duchess of Longueville (1619–1679), Anne Geneviève de Bourbon, sister of the Louis, Grand Condé and protector of Port Royal, offered substantial donations for construction of the building. After her death, her remains were interred at Port-Royal des Champs. When the abbey was destroyed, her heart was deposited in the chapel of Saint-Jacques-du-Haut-Pas.

Work could therefore resume in 1675. The selected architect was Daniel Gittard, who among other works had already built the choir of the Church of Saint-Sulpice. He created the plans for the façade, but it was not carried out as planned. Of the two towers foreseen by Gittard, one was eventually built, but at twice the height of the initial plans.
By 6 May 1685 the main work was completed. An important dedication ceremony took place at which François Fénelon and Esprit Fléchier preached. The Chapel of the Virgin was built in 1687, following the plans of the architect Libéral Bruant, to whom we owe the Hotel des Invalides and the Hôpital de la Salpêtrière.

The original organ was later replaced by other instruments, including one that the Abbé Courcaut, the parish priest, installed himself in 1733. A larger organ made by François Thierry was installed in 1742. 
After the Saint-Benoît-le-Bétourné Collegiate was secularized in 1792, its organ was transferred and installed by Claude-François Clicquot.  This organ was made by Matthijs Langhedul.  Part of the wooden buffet had been made by Claude Delaistre in 1587, so the church has part of the oldest organ case in Paris.

Jean-Denis Cochin 

Jean-Denis Cochin (1726–1783) was the parish priest from 1756 to 1780. 
He created devotional works, but his main occupation was to help disadvantaged people. 
He founded a hospital to receive indigent patients, for which he laid the foundation stone on 25 September 1780 in the Faubourg Saint-Jacques. 
He named it after the parish patrons, Hôpital Saint-Jacques-Saint-Philippe-du-Haut-Pas.
The hospital treated injuries suffered by poor workers, most of whom worked in the nearby quarries.
Jean-Denis Cochin was buried at the foot of the chancel of the church.
In 1802 the hospital was given the name of its founder: Hôpital Cochin.

French revolution 

During the French revolution, the church was sacked in 1793, like many other churches. In 1793, the church was one of the fifteen churches available to the Catholics by the Parisian National Convention following the recognition of the freedom of worship. Vincent Duval was elected pastor of the parish by the residents.
In 1797, the law required equal access to religious buildings for all religions who requested it. 
The theophilantropists asked to be allowed to use the church as a meeting place. The church took the name of the Temple of Charity. 
The choir was reserved for theophilantropes and the nave remained available to Catholics.
After the Concordat of 1801, under Napoleon, the parish regained use of the entire building.

19th and 20th centuries

The building had been simply and sparsely decorated due to the influence of Jansenism.
In the nineteenth century, mainly during the July Monarchy and under the Second Empire, it was considerably embellished.
Many paintings and stained glass windows were offered by wealthy families such as the Baudicour family, 
who in 1835 provided the altar located in the north aisle and the entire decoration of the chapel of Saint-Pierre.
Auguste Barthelemy Glaize, a student of Achille and Eugène Devéria, redecorated the chapel of the Virgin in 1868.

In 1871 an explosion of the Luxembourg powder magazine caused major damage to the organ. It was not until 1906 that it was restored, with innovative electro-pneumatic components.  These gradually deteriorated, and another major restoration was undertaken in the 1960s by Alfred Kern & fils. 
The new organ, which retains parts of the old, was inaugurated on 18 May 1971 by Pierre Cochereau.
Following the Second Vatican Council (1962-1965), the interior space was rearranged.
An altar, cross and a pulpit by the sculptor Léon Zack were placed in the transept.

Charles de Sévigné (1648-1713), son of the famous Marie de Rabutin-Chantal, marquise de Sévigné, is buried here.  
After living very gallantly as a young man, he later turned to the austere life of the Jansenists. 
The Italian/French astronomer Giovanni Domenico Cassini (1625–1712) and the French mathematician and astronomer Philippe de La Hire (1640–1718) were also buried here. The funeral of the French mathematical physicist Henri Poincaré on 19 July 1912 took place in this church.

The Church interior was also renovated in the 20th century, following the Second Vatican Council, most notably with the total removal of the historic high altar. The current main altar now a simplistic table in the crossing of the Church, on a temporary carpeted platform. The furnishings typical of the choir in a French Church such as this were also completely removed, leaving the building lacking the clear architectural focus that the original altar arrangement had.

Gallery

References

Notes

Citations

Sources

 

Roman Catholic churches in the 5th arrondissement of Paris
Monuments historiques of Paris
Order of Saint James of Altopascio